The Dallas–Fort Worth (DFW) area has one of the largest Indian American populations in the United States, comprising over 145,000 individuals, or roughly 2% of the metro area's total population.
First settling in the area as doctors, engineers, and skilled professionals in the medical field, the community has expanded to include information-technology specialists and those in the higher educational realm, including both students and professors. Through multiple waves of immigration periods and beginning families in the region, the Indian population in the DFW area has more than doubled from 2000 to 2010. Recently, there has been an influx of Indians in Frisco and  Allen. Asian Indians make up the majority of the population in many subdivisions in Frisco.

History
The Dallas-Fort Worth area is home to one of the oldest Indian American communities in Texas. Despite harsh immigration laws being passed in the early and mid 1900s, such as the Immigration Act of 1917 and the 1946 Luce-Celler Act, Indian immigrants, mainly skilled farmers from North India seeking agricultural work came to the region. By 1930, 49 Indians lived in Texas as a whole, many of whom resided in Dallas.

After the 1965 Immigration Act led passed and the quota system for immigrants based on country of origin was removed, a swell of Indian immigration to Dallas ensued. With skilled workers being favored, Indians adept in high technology, engineering, energy, manufacturing, and medical fields began clustering within Dallas county. Moreover, the late 1960s and 70s saw an influx of Indian women immigrating to the city, particularly nurses from South India following a national shortage post the Vietnam War.

A second wave of more recent immigrants arrived starting in the 1990s with H1-B visas granted for jobs within the domestic workforce. Indians currently claim 41% of the H1-B visas granted nationally and many have been recruited this way by information-technology firms in the Las Colinas and Richardson areas. Moreover, beginning in the 1980s, many Indians have came to Dallas to pursue advanced degrees at higher education universities like Southern Methodist University (SMU) and the University of Texas at Dallas (UTD). They have subsequently begun families in the area, generating a significant economic impact as both consumers and producers. Such large-scale immigration waves have assisted Dallas' booming economy that has been hungry for talented employees.

Demography
From 2000 to 2010 the Asian Indian community of Dallas-Fort Worth more than doubled, with 106,964 Asian Indians residing in Collin,  Dallas,  Denton,  Rockwall, and  Tarrant counties.

Culture

In 2012 there were 90 Indian restaurants within a 40-mile radius of Dallas.

Economy

By 1994, families named Patel owned about 80% of the 90 small motels in Dallas.

Notable People

 Ravi Batra, bestselling author and economist
 Siddharth Katragadda, author, filmmaker, artist
 Vistasp Karbhari, former president of the University of Texas at Arlington, (2013-2020)
 Thirunavukkarasu Kumaran, cricketer and former coach of the national under-19 team
 Sanjay Lal, former wide receivers coach for the Dallas Cowboys
 Manny Malhotra, former NHL hockey player for the Dallas Stars
 Shelly Malil, film and TV actor
 Faris McReynolds, painter and musician
 Saraju Mohanty, professor of computer science and engineering at the University of North Texas
 K. R. Rao, professor at University of Texas at Arlington
 Mehul Shah, actor, director, writer, and producer
 Tiya Sircar, actress
 Paul Varghese, comedian who appeared on Last Comic Standing

References

Indian
History of Dallas
History of Fort Worth, Texas
Indian-American culture in Texas
Dallas